Luthite is a lightweight synthetic material developed by the Westheimer Corporation (a United States-based importer of Cort Guitars) for the construction of bass guitar and electric guitar bodies. The 1996 patent application credits Jack L. Westheimer as the sole inventor. The term refers both to the composite material and to its forming process. Luthite is very similar in purpose to the later Vibracell used in the all-plastic Switch Music instruments.

Luthite was developed specifically for use in building stringed musical instruments (luthiery). The intention was to create a substitute for wood in building solid-body electric guitars and basses, as there is much greater control over the consistency of production, and thus of tone and overall quality from one instrument to the next. Additionally, the material is able to be formed to almost any shape (i.e. 3-D shapes out of plane) where the wood equivalent would require a very large body blank or laminates.

Apart from these advantages, Luthite is less resistant to impact than its wooden counterparts, which renders finished instruments more susceptible to dings and chips; or developing cracks if dropped or otherwise stressed. 

Luthite was employed in Ibanez  Ergodyne series electric guitars (EDR/EXR) and basses (EDA/EDB/EDC), and Cort Curbow series basses.

References 

Electric bass guitars